The first season of the musical comedy-drama television series Glee originally aired on Fox in the United States. The pilot episode was broadcast as an advanced preview of the series on May 19, 2009, with the remainder of the season airing between September 9, 2009, and June 8, 2010. The season consisted of 22 episodes; the first 13 aired on Wednesdays at 9 pm (ET) and the final 9 aired on Tuesdays at 9 pm (ET). The season was executive produced by Ryan Murphy, Brad Falchuk, and Dante Di Loreto; Murphy's production company helped co-produce the series alongside 20th Century Fox.

The season features the fictional high school show choir New Directions competing for the first time on the show choir circuit, while its members and faculty deal with sex, bullying, body image, homosexuality, teenage pregnancy, disabilities, adoption and other social issues. The central characters are glee club director Will Schuester (Matthew Morrison), cheerleading coach Sue Sylvester (Jane Lynch), Will's former wife Terri (Jessalyn Gilsig), guidance counselor Emma Pillsbury (Jayma Mays), and glee club members Rachel (Lea Michele), Finn (Cory Monteith), Artie (Kevin McHale), Kurt (Chris Colfer), Mercedes (Amber Riley), Tina (Jenna Ushkowitz), Puck (Mark Salling), and Quinn (Dianna Agron).

The season received generally positive reviews from critics. The musical scores used throughout the first season proved to be a commercial success, with over seven million copies of Glee cast single releases purchased digitally. In 2009, the Glee remake of "Don't Stop Believin' became their first hit, and other covers quickly gained similar worldwide popularity, while the albums topped the charts in Ireland and other countries. The season was nominated for 19 Emmy Awards, four Golden Globe Awards, six Satellite Awards and 57 other awards. It was accompanied by four DVD releases: Glee – Pilot Episode: Director's Cut, Glee – Season 1, Volume 1: Road to Sectionals featuring episodes one to thirteen, Glee – Season 1, Volume 2: Road to Regionals featuring episodes fourteen to twenty-two, and Glee – The Complete First Season.

Episodes

Production

The season was produced by 20th Century Fox Television and Ryan Murphy Television, and was aired on Fox in the US. The executive producers were Dante Di Loreto and series creators Ryan Murphy and Brad Falchuk, with John Peter Kousas and creator Ian Brennan acting as co-executive producers. The first two episodes were co-written by Murphy, Falchuk and Brennan; all other episodes were written by them individually. Murphy and Falchuk also directed several episodes, while other episodes were directed by Elodie Keene, John Scott, Paris Barclay, Bill D'Elia and Alfonso Gomez-Rejon. Joss Whedon guest-directed the episode "Dream On". 
The pilot episode was broadcast as a preview of the season on May 19, 2009. The series returned on September 9, 2009, and after three episodes, Fox picked Glee up for a full season on September 21, 2009. The initial run of thirteen episodes aired until December 9, 2009, with the series then taking a mid-season break until April 13, 2010. After airing on Wednesdays at 9 pm (ET), the first season moved to Tuesdays in the same timeslot for the final nine episodes. The commissioning of a second season was announced on January 11, 2010, with the production of a third season announced on May 23, 2010.

The series features numerous musical cover versions performed on-screen by the characters. At the beginning of the season, Murphy intended for the performances to remain reality-based, as opposed to having the characters spontaneously burst into song. As the season progressed, however, Glee began to utilize fantasy sequences, with paraplegic character Artie imagining himself dancing to "The Safety Dance", and six separate characters performing a fantasy version of "Like a Virgin". The first thirteen episodes of the season averaged five songs per episode. For the final nine episodes, the number of performances increased to eight. Murphy believes that many of the songs were "really fun and successful", however the production team intend to return to five songs per episode for Glee second season, in order to return focus to the characters.

When seeking to attain the rights to songs, early in the season Murphy was often requested to send out advanced scripts, but refused, not wanting to set a precedent for record labels having creative involvement in the show. Singer Rihanna offered her single "Take a Bow" for use at a reduced licensing rate. Madonna granted the show rights to her entire catalogue, and the tribute episode "The Power of Madonna" features Madonna performances exclusively.

In total, five soundtracks were released to accompany the first season. Three albums released over the course of the season (Glee: The Music, Volume 1, Glee: The Music, Volume 2, and Glee: The Music, Volume 3 Showstoppers) compiled various songs throughout the series, while two EPs (Glee: The Music, The Power of Madonna and Glee: The Music, Journey to Regionals) were released on the same day as the respective episodes aired. Journey to Regionals did not release any official singles, while the remaining four albums were fully released as singles. Following the completion of the season, the Glee cast performed a 13-date concert tour in North America, Glee Live! In Concert! By its conclusion, tickets for all 13 performances had sold out, grossing $5,031,438.

Cast

The season had a cast of twelve actors who received star billing. Matthew Morrison played Will Schuester, director of the McKinley High glee club. Jane Lynch played Sue Sylvester, head coach of the cheerleading squad and the glee club's nemesis. Jayma Mays portrayed Emma Pillsbury, a mysophobic guidance counselor with romantic feelings for Will. Jessalyn Gilsig played Terri Schuester, Will's wife of five years. Lea Michele played Rachel Berry, the star of the glee club. Cory Monteith portrayed Finn Hudson, star quarterback of the school's football team, who is blackmailed into joining the club. Also playing club members were Amber Riley as Mercedes Jones, Chris Colfer as Kurt Hummel, Kevin McHale as Artie Abrams, and Jenna Ushkowitz as Tina Cohen-Chang. Mark Salling played Noah "Puck" Puckerman, a football player and bully who later joined the club, while Dianna Agron portrayed Quinn Fabray, Finn's girlfriend and captain of the cheerleading squad, who became pregnant with Puck's baby.

A number of secondary characters were also portrayed throughout the season, including Patrick Gallagher as Ken Tanaka, coach of the football team, Iqbal Theba as Principal Figgins, and Stephen Tobolowsky as former glee club director Sandy Ryerson. Mike O'Malley appeared as Kurt's father Burt Hummel, and Romy Rosemont played Finn's mother Carole Hudson. Naya Rivera and Heather Morris played Santana Lopez and Brittany Pierce, cheerleaders who joined the glee club with Quinn. Harry Shum, Jr. and Dijon Talton were initially hired for a single episode as football players Mike Chang and Matt Rutherford, but remained on the show as supporting members of the glee club.

Guest stars from musical backgrounds were often featured on the show, including John Lloyd Young as wood shop teacher Henri St. Pierre, and Victor Garber and Debra Monk as Will's parents. Josh Groban appeared playing an "ignorant asshole" version of himself, while Olivia Newton-John portrayed the "dark side" of herself; a "mixture of mean and diva". Kristin Chenoweth played April Rhodes, a former member of the glee club who never finished high school and ended up hitting rock bottom. Jonathan Groff played Jesse St. James, the male lead of rival glee club Vocal Adrenaline, and Idina Menzel appeared as Vocal Adrenaline director Shelby Corcoran, who is revealed in "Dream On" to be Rachel's biological mother. Fans had originally lobbied for Menzel to be cast as Rachel's mother due to the strong physical resemblance between Menzel and Michele. Eve played the Jane Addams Girls Choir director Grace Hitchens, having been cast after Whitney Houston declined to appear. Michael Hitchcock appeared as the Haverbrook School for the Deaf choir director Dalton Rumba.

Sarah Drew played Suzy Pepper, a senior with "an insane, absurd, psychotic crush on Mr. Schuester". Drew described Suzy as "kind of stalkerish and creepy", but ultimately redeemable. Gregg Henry and Charlotte Ross appeared as Quinn's parents, Russell and Judy Fabray, and Molly Shannon played Brenda Castle, an alcoholic astronomy teacher and badminton coach who clashed with Sue. Neil Patrick Harris guest starred as Bryan Ryan, Will's former glee club rival, now a school board member bent on vengeance against the club. Murphy created the role particularly for Harris, who received clearance from CBS to appear on Fox for the episode.

Music

The show's musical performances proved to be a commercial success, with over seven million copies of Glee cast single releases purchased digitally. The cast performance of "Don't Stop Believin' reached number two in the United Kingdom, and number four in the US and Ireland. It was certified gold by the Recording Industry Association of America (RIAA) on October 13, 2009, achieving over 730,000 digital sales. The cast had their first number one single with a cover of "Gives You Hell" in Ireland. By June 2010, the cast were second behind the Beatles for most chart appearances by a group act in the Billboard Hot 100's 52-year history, and seventh overall among all artists, with 71 appearances. The series' cover versions have also had a positive effect on the original recording artists, such as for Rihanna; sales of "Take a Bow" increased by 189 percent after the song was covered in the Glee episode "Showmance".

The series' debut album, Glee: The Music, Volume 1, reached number one in Ireland and the UK and was certified platinum by the Australian Recording Industry Association (ARIA), Canadian Recording Industry Association (CRIA), and British Phonographic Industry (BPI), and gold by the RIAA. In December 2009, the second album, Glee: The Music, Volume 2, topped the charts in New Zealand, Ireland, and Scotland. It has been certified platinum by the ARIA and CRIA, and gold by the BPI and RIAA. In 2010, the next two releases – Glee: The Music, The Power of Madonna and Glee: The Music, Volume 3 Showstoppers – both debuted at the number one position on the American and Canadian album charts. With the releases reaching number one in the US four weeks apart, the Glee cast beat the record previously set by the Beatles in 1966 for shortest span between first weeks at number one. This record was yet again beaten by Glee: The Music, Journey to Regionals, when it reached number one in the US three weeks later. Glee: The Music, Volume 3 Showstoppers also reached number one in Australia, Ireland, and Scotland, acquiring a gold certification by the ARIA. Glee: The Music, Journey to Regionals also reached number one in Ireland.

Reception

Critical response
The review aggregator website Rotten Tomatoes gives the first season an 88% with an average rating of 7.94/10, based on 49 reviews. The site's consensus reads, "Entertaining, snarky, and full of heart, Glee is an addictive, toe-tapping musical dramedy that hits all the right notes." On Metacritic it received a score of 78 out of 100 based on 19 reviews, indicating "generally favorable reviews".

Following the season preview in May 2009, Alessandra Stanley for The New York Times called the show "blissfully unoriginal in a witty, imaginative way", finding the characters to be stereotypes but noting "a strong satiric pulse that doesn't diminish the characters' identities or dim the showmanship of a talented cast". The Daily News David Hinckley wrote that the show "isn't close to perfect" but "has likable characters, a good sense of humor and a reasonably deft touch with music." Mary McNamara for the Los Angeles Times found the series to have a wide audience appeal, deeming Glee "the first show in a long time that's just plain full-throttle, no-guilty-pleasure-rationalizations-necessary fun."

James Poniewozik of Time ranked Glee the eighth best television show of 2009 out of ten reviewed, deeming it "transcendent, tear-jerking and thrilling like nothing else on TV". He noted that the series did have faults, but praised its ambition and Lynch's "gaspingly funny" performance as Sue. Entertainment Weekly Ken Tucker ranked the season ninth out of ten, lauding its novelty, while Lisa Respers France of CNN wrote that despite its "recipe for disaster" premise, the show's charm and bravado were enough to engage audiences. Variety Brian Lowry was critical of the season's early episodes, highlighting acting and characterization issues, stating that the show's talent was squandered by its uneven tone and deeming Glee a one-hit-wonder. Following the mid-season finale, Lowry wrote that while the series still had problems, its musical performances and cast were enough to keep him watching, and despite its issues, "TV would be poorer without Glee." John Doyle of The Globe and Mail criticized the season's development, writing that while early episodes had been enjoyable, the show's success drew focus away from its characters and plot onto celebrity guest stars. Jean Bentley of MTV found the season uneven, writing that it began with a promising plot and impressive musical numbers, but became too "cheesy" and excessively sentimental. Raymund Flandez of The Wall Street Journal agreed that the season had definite highs and lows, but called the finale a "warm embrace that – let’s face it – you just don't want to let go."

After the episode "Showmance", the Parents Television Council named Glee the "Worst Show of the Week", deeming it inappropriate for teenagers due to its "sexually-charged adult" nature. Nancy Gibbs of Time magazine wrote that she had heard Glee described as "anti-Christian" by a youth minister, but commented that while almost all of the Ten Commandments are violated during the season, she found it insulting to teenagers to suggest that they would attempt to emulate what they saw on-screen. She described Glee as being about "a journey not just to college and career but to identity and conviction, the price of popularity, the compromises we must make between what we want and what we need." The episode "Wheels" attracted criticism from a committee of performers with disabilities, who felt that casting an able-bodied actor to play a student with disabilities was inappropriate. Falchuk responded that while he understood the concern and frustration of disability advocates, McHale had the singing and acting ability, talent and charisma required for the role.

Ratings
The pilot episode of Glee averaged 9.62 million viewers. Re-aired on September 2, 2009, in a director's cut version, it attained 4.2 million viewers. The second episode, "Showmance", premiered on September 9, 2009, averaging 7.50 million viewers and achieving a 3.5/9 rating/share in the 18–49 demographic. However, as Scott Collins for the Los Angeles Times noted, the other major networks besides Fox all opened the evening by airing a speech by President Barack Obama, disrupting regular viewing patterns. Furthermore, the official fall season had yet to begin, placing Glee against weaker competition in the ratings than the remainder of the season would experience. The following eight episodes ranged between 6.63 and 7.65 million viewers, falling to a series low of 6.17 million viewers with "Hairography" on November 25, 2009. The episode aired the night before Thanksgiving, when all the major networks saw decreased ratings. Viewership improved for the final two episodes of the first half of the season, with "Mattress" and "Sectionals" drawing 8.15 and 8.13 million viewers respectively. Glee returned on April 13, 2010, with "Hell-O", which was watched by 13.66 million viewers, the series' season high, up 46 percent on its previous season high with the pilot episode. The following six episodes attained between 11.49 and 12.98 million viewers, falling to 9.02 million for the penultimate episode "Funk". The episode began with a 3.6/10 rating/share in the 18–49 demographic, rising to 4.1/11 in the last 30 minutes. It was down 21 percent on the previous episode, but was Glee best 18–49 rating for an episode not following American Idol. The final episode, "Journey to Regionals", was watched by 11.07 million viewers and attained a 4.7 Nielsen rating in the 18–49 demographic, an increase of 18 percent on the previous episode, giving Glee the highest finale rating for a new show in the 2009–2010 television season.

Accolades

During its first season, Glee was nominated for 86 awards, of which 37 were won. Murphy and Barclay were both nominated for the "Outstanding Directing – Comedy Series" award at the 2010 Directors Guild of America Awards for their work on "Pilot" and "Wheels" respectively. The series was nominated for ten Creative Arts Emmy Awards and nine Primetime Emmy Awards. It received eight nominations at the Gay, Lesbian and Bi People's Choice Awards, run by the gay media websites AfterEllen.com and AfterElton.com, of which it won seven. It was also awarded three Dorian Awards by the Gay and Lesbian Entertainment Critics Association. Glee received four nominations at the 67th Golden Globe Awards, winning one, and was nominated in six categories at the 2009 Satellite Awards, winning five. Glee received three nominations for the Teen Choice Awards in 2009, and thirteen in 2010. The series received four nominations for the 2010 TCA Awards, winning three, while Brennan, Falchuk and Murphy each received two nominations at the 2010 Writers Guild of America Awards.

The series won "Outstanding TV Program of the Year" at the 2009 AFI Awards, "Favorite New TV Comedy" at the 2010 People's Choice Awards, "Outstanding Comedy Series" at the 21st GLAAD Media Awards, "Future Classic" at the 2010 TV Land Awards, a Peabody Award for excellence, and "Do Something TV Show" at the VH1 Do Something Awards. It was also nominated for the "NAACP Image Award for Outstanding Comedy Series" at the NAACP Image Awards, the "Comedy Series Episode" Prism Awards for "Vitamin D", "Fave International Band" and "Fave TV Show" at the Nickelodeon Australian Kids Choice Awards 2010, and shortlisted for the "YouTube Audience Award" at the BAFTA Awards. The cast won "Favorite New Television Cast Ensemble" at the Diversity Awards, and "Outstanding Performance by an Ensemble in a Comedy Series" at the 2010 Screen Actors Guild Awards. In 2009, the crew won an Artios Award for the casting of "Pilot". They also won "Outstanding Musical Supervision – TV" at the Hollywood Music in Media Awards, and the "Outstanding Contemporary Television Series" award at the CDG Awards, and were nominated for the "Single Camera Television Series" Art Directors Guild Award for "Pilot", and "Outstanding Achievement in Sound Mixing for a Television Series" at the Cinema Audio Society Awards for "Wheels". In 2010, David Klotz won "Best Sound Editing: Short Form Music in Television" at the Golden Reel Awards for his work on "Pilot", "Wheels" won a "Television With a Conscience" Television Academy Honors award, and Brennan, Falchuk and Murphy jointly won "Comedy Writer of the Year" at the Just for Laughs Awards.

Home video releases
Glee – Pilot Episode: Director's Cut was released on Region 1 DVD in the US on September 1, 2009, exclusively to Wal-Mart. It was released on Region 4 DVD in Australia and New Zealand on November 25, 2009, and on Region 2 DVD in the UK and Ireland on January 25, 2010. The DVD includes a preview of the episode "Showmance", plus a deconstruction of the series by creator Ryan Murphy.

Glee – Season 1, Volume 1: Road to Sectionals contains the first thirteen episodes of the first season. It was released as a four-disc box set on Region 1 DVD in the US and Canada on December 29, 2009. It was released on Region 4 DVD in Australia and New Zealand on March 31, 2010, and on Region 2 DVD in the UK and Ireland on April 19, 2010, and in South Africa on August 14, 2010. Special features include full length audition pieces from the pilot episode by Michele as Rachel and Riley as Mercedes, plus casting and choreography featurettes. Glee – Season 1, Volume 2: Road to Regionals contains the final nine episodes of the first season. It was released on Region 2 DVD in the UK and Ireland on September 13, 2010, Region 1 DVD in the US on September 14, 2010, and on Region 4 DVD in Australia and New Zealand on September 22, 2010.

Glee – The Complete Season 1 was released on Region 2 DVD on September 13, 2010, Region 1 DVD on September 14, 2010, and Region 4 DVD on September 22, 2010. The seven-disc box set contains the full 22 episode first season, including extended episodes, sing-along karaoke, a behind-the-scenes look at "The Power of Madonna" episode, Glee makeovers, never-before-seen 'Sue's Corner' segments and a dance tutorial. It was also released as a four-disc Blu-ray box set.

Notes

References

General
 
 
Specific

2009 American television seasons
2010 American television seasons
 1